This article is a non-exhaustive list of the château, located in the French department of Loir-et-Cher in the Centre-Val de Loire region.

List of châteaux

 Château de Beauregard in Cellettes
 Château de Blois in Blois
 Château du Breuil in Cheverny 
 Château de Chambord in Chambord 
 Château de Chaslay in Montoire-sur-le-Loir
 Château de Chaumont-sur-Loire in Chaumont-sur-Loire
 Château de Cheverny in Cheverny 
 Château de Chémery in Chémery
 Château de Chissay in Chissay-en-Touraine
 Château de Droué in Droué
 Château de Fougères-sur-Bièvre in Fougères-sur-Bièvre
 Château du Fresne in Authon
 Château de Fréteval in Fréteval 
Château des Grotteaux in Huisseau-sur-Cosson
 Château du Gué-Péan in Monthou-sur-Cher
 Château d'Herbilly in Mer
 Château de la Ferté in La Ferté-Imbault
 Châteazu de Launoy in Souvigny-en-Sologne
 Château de Lavardin in Lavardin
 Château de Matval in Bonneveau
 Château de Menars in Menars
 Château de Montoire in Montoire-sur-le-Loir
 Château de Montrichard in Montrichard
 Château du Moulin in Lassay-sur-Croisne
 Château du Plessis-Fortia in Huisseau-en-Beauce
 Château de la Possonnière in Couture-sur-Loir, (dit château de Ronsard)
 Château de Saint-Denis-sur-Loire in Saint-Denis-sur-Loire
 Château de Selles-sur-Cher in Selles-sur-Cher
 Château de Talcy in Talcy
 Château de Troussay in Cheverny
 Château de Vendôme in Vendôme 
 Château de Villebourgeon in Neung-sur-Beuvron
 Château de Villesavin in Tour-en-Sologne 
 Château d'ortie in Salbris
 Château de Rivaulde in Salbris

See also
 List of châteaux in Centre-Val de Loire
 List of châteaux in France
 List of castles in France

References

External links
American Commission for Protection and Salvage of Artistic and Historic Monuments in War Areas (1946)

Loir-et-Cher